Mozes Adams (born 21 July 1988 in Saminaka, southern Kaduna State, Nigeria) is a Nigerian footballer. Adams plays in the central midfield and last played for KVC Westerlo in Belgium.

Career 
He moved on 2 January 2007 from Ranchers Bees to K.V.C. Westerlo. In summer 2012 was released by Westerlo and trained with R. Cappellen F.C. After a season with knee problems, signed first in summer 2013 for R. Cappellen F.C. in January 2015 moses joined to club Ironi Tiberias from Israel.

International career 
Adams was member of the Nigeria U-20 at 2007 FIFA U-20 World Cup in Canada.

References

1988 births
Living people
Nigerian footballers
Nigeria under-20 international footballers
Belgian Pro League players
Liga Leumit players
Nigerian expatriate footballers
Ranchers Bees F.C. players
K.V.C. Westerlo players
Ironi Tiberias F.C. players
Royal Cappellen F.C. players
Expatriate footballers in Belgium
Expatriate footballers in Israel
Association football midfielders